Un original y veinte copias (English: An original and twenty copies) is a Mexican telenovela produced by Guillermo González for Canal de las Estrellas in 1978. It is a remake of the 1958 Mexican telenovela Gutierritos produced by Valentín Pimstein.

César Bono, Julieta Bracho and Eduardo Alcaraz star as the protagonists, while Antonio Brillas, Teo Tapia, Gina Montes and Patricia Ancira star as the antagonists.

Cast 
 César Bono as Totopos
 Julieta Bracho as María
 Eduardo Alcaraz as Dr. Osorio
 Antonio Brillas as Chino Villegas 
 Gina Montes as Patty
 Teo Tapia as Sr. Romano
 Patricia Ancira as Katty
 Sergio Bustamante as Sr. Legorreta
 Zully Keith as Marilú
 Mauricio Herrera as Gustavo
 Delia Magaña as Juventina 
 Carlos Riquelme as Donato 
 Luis Couturier as Varaltedelc
 Guillermo Orea as Victorio Pérez
 Rubén Calderón as Teófilo 
 Alvaro Carcaño as El Borrachito

References

External links 

Un original y veinte copias at the Alma Latina Database
Un original y veinte copias at the Series Now Database

Mexican telenovelas
1978 telenovelas
Televisa telenovelas
Spanish-language telenovelas
1978 Mexican television series debuts
1978 Mexican television series endings